Kenneth "Redneck" Dement (February 13, 1933 – February 15, 2013) was an American football offensive tackle/defensive tackle. He played college football for Southeast Missouri State University. He was a 25th round selection (296th overall) selection by the New York Giants in the 1955 NFL Draft. But instead of playing professionally, Dement joined the United States Marines Corps where he achieved the rank of captain. After his military career, Dement went back to school, earning a law degree at Washington University School of Law in St. Louis. He returned to Sikeston, Missouri where he had grown up and began practicing law.  From 1976 until 1981, he served on the Board of Regents for Southeast Missouri State University, including in the role as its president.  Dement was once interviewed by Mike Wallace on 60 Minutes regarding a court case.  He was elected to the College Football Hall of Fame in 1998. He had six children including one who preceded him in death. Dement died on February 15, 2013, in Cape Girardeau, Missouri.  He was 80.

References

1933 births
2013 deaths
People from Poplar Bluff, Missouri
People from Sikeston, Missouri
American football offensive tackles
American football defensive tackles
Southeast Missouri State Redhawks football players
United States Marine Corps officers
Washington University School of Law alumni
Missouri lawyers
College Football Hall of Fame inductees
Washington University in St. Louis alumni